Alexander Wiley (1884–1967) was a U.S. Senator from Wisconsin from 1939 to 1963. Senator Wiley may also refer to:

Ariosto A. Wiley (1848–1908), Alabama State Senate
James Franklin Wiley (1832–1902), Wisconsin State Senate
Rankin Wiley Jr. (1853–1929), West Virginia State Senate
Sean Wiley (born 1971), Pennsylvania State Senate
Stephen B. Wiley (1929–2015), New Jersey State Senate

See also
Senator Willey (disambiguation)